The 1951 Spanish Grand Prix was a Formula One motor race held on 28 October 1951 at Pedralbes Circuit. It was the eighth and final race of the 1951 World Championship of Drivers.

This race was determined by tyre choice – Ferrari chose a 16-inch rear wheel, whilst Alfa Romeo settled for the 18 inch, which proved to be the better of the two options.
Juan Manuel Fangio led Alberto Ascari by two points before the race. Ascari led the race from José Froilán González, but the Ferraris suffered numerous tread problems. Piero Taruffi threw a tyre tread on lap 6 and was followed on lap 7 by Luigi Villoresi, Ascari on lap 8 and Gonzalez on lap 14. The Ferraris were forced to stop frequently to change tyres and Fangio comfortably won the race and his first drivers' title, after Ascari finished 4th was not able to overhaul Fangio's total. After the race, Alfa Romeo announced that due to lack of finances, they would not be competing in the 1952 season.

Entries

 — Peter Whitehead and Reg Parnell both withdrew from the event prior to practice.
 — Juan Jover qualified in the #46 Maserati, although he did not start the race. Joaquin Palacio had been entered in car #46, but he withdrew prior to practice.
 — Toni Branca withdrew from the event prior to practice. Chico Landi had also been entered in car #48, but he too withdrew from the Grand Prix before practice.

Classification

Qualifying

Race

Notes
 – Includes 1 point for fastest lap

Championship permutations
 Three drivers were fighting for the championship going into the race: Fangio on 27 points, Ascari on 25 points and González on 21 points.
 Fangio would finish ahead of Ascari in the Championship if:
 Fangio finished ahead of Ascari, or
 Ascari finished 3rd or lower
 Fangio would finish ahead of González in the Championship if:
 González failed to win with the fastest lap or
 Fangio scored at least one point with González winning with the fastest lap
 Ascari would win the championship if he either:
 won, or
 finished 2nd with Fangio 3rd or lower
 González needed to win, and set the fastest lap, with Ascari finishing third or lower and Fangio not scoring at all to win the Championship.

Championship standings after the race 
Drivers' Championship standings

Note: Only the top five positions are included. Only the best 4 results counted towards the Championship. Numbers without parentheses are Championship points; numbers in parentheses are total points scored.

References

Spanish
Spanish Grand Prix
1951 in Spanish motorsport
Spanish